Silvia Fürst (born 8 May 1961) is a Swiss former cyclist. She competed in the women's cross-country mountain biking event at the 1996 Summer Olympics.

References

External links
 

1961 births
Living people
Swiss female cyclists
Olympic cyclists of Switzerland
Cyclists at the 1996 Summer Olympics
Cyclists from Bern
20th-century Swiss women
21st-century Swiss women